The House at 307 Lexington Street in Newton, Massachusetts, is a well-preserved small-scale Greek Revival house.  The -story wood-frame house was built c. 1860, and has a steeply pitched gable roof with paired gable dormers on the side, and a round-arch window at the top of the gable (an Italianate feature).  The front gable hangs over a full-width porch supported by Doric columns.  A classic entablature encircles the house.

The house was listed on the National Register of Historic Places in 1986.

See also
 National Register of Historic Places listings in Newton, Massachusetts

References

Houses on the National Register of Historic Places in Newton, Massachusetts
Houses completed in 1860
Greek Revival architecture in Massachusetts